Swansea services ("Swansea West services") is a motorway service station on the M4 motorway at Junction 47 near Penllergaer, Swansea, Wales. It is owned by Moto.

References

External links 
 
Swansea Services - Motorway Services Online

M4 motorway service stations
Moto motorway service stations
Transport in Swansea
Motorways in Wales